New Beginnings is the fifth studio album by American psychedelic rock band Radio Moscow (or their sixth album, if the 2012 album 3 & 3 Quarters, which was a collection of demos recorded and produced in 2003 by frontman Parker Griggs before the formation of the band, is included). It is their first album with Century Media Records having all previous releases been with Alive Naturalsound.

Track listing 

All tracks written by Parker Griggs unless otherwise stated.

Personnel
Radio Moscow
Parker Griggs – vocals, guitars, drums and percussion (on track 9 only), production, mixing
Anthony Meier – bass
Paul Marrone – drums and percussion (on all except track 9), piano (on track 5)
Additional personnel
Travis Baucum – harmonica (on tracks 4 & 6)
Mike Butler – engineering
Mark Chalecki – mastering
Courtney Cole – artwork
Dana Trippe – photography
Nora Dirkling – layout

References

External links 
 Album website
 iTunes preview

2017 albums
Radio Moscow (band) albums
Century Media Records albums